Alte Schlaube is a river of Brandenburg, Germany. It is the former lower course of the Schlaube. It discharges into the Brieskower See, which is connected to the Oder, near Brieskow-Finkenheerd.

See also
List of rivers of Brandenburg

Rivers of Brandenburg
Rivers of Germany